Brodimoprim is a structural derivative of trimethoprim. In brodimoprim, the 4-methoxy group of trimethoprim is replaced with a bromine atom.

As trimethoprim, brodimoprim is a selective inhibitor of bacterial dihydrofolate reductase.

References 

Bacterial dihydrofolate reductase inhibitors
Aminopyrimidines
Resorcinol ethers
Bromoarenes